Roger Lim (born June 4, 1968) is an American actor, director, producer, and screenwriter.

Education and early career 
Born and raised in San Francisco, California, he graduated from the University of San Francisco with a B.A. in Psychology. As a junior at the Lowell High School (San Francisco), he was named All-City pitcher after winning his school's first-ever playoff-championship game at Candlestick Park. After a career threatening rotator cuff injury his senior year, he managed to walk on as an outfielder his freshman year at USF. With his arm fully recovered, he transferred to Cal State East Bay in Hayward, where he finished as the team's second leading hitter. In between college seasons, he competed at third base in front of professional scouts at recruitment camps for the Seattle Mariners, Philadelphia Phillies, and the Major League Scouting Bureau. After returning to USF to earn his degree, he converted to a full-time catcher, playing on various semi-pro teams around Northern and Southern California. After settling in L.A., he began training concurrently in massage therapy and acting courses. During that time, he landed various talent agents, leading him to model in over 150 print ad campaigns. During his studies at the Larry Moss Studios he started writing. Soon afterwards he began scripting his AmerAsian Trilogy.

Filmmaker 
Rush Hour 2 (2001) — Lim's first-ever job behind the camera was as a stand-in for Jackie Chan during the final stages of production in Los Angeles. Watching Jackie work so closely with Brett Ratner was an extremely enlightening experience, teaching him the value of timing, precision and perfection.

AmerAsian (2009) — Lim's first AmerAsian film as actor/ director/ producer/ screenwriter was completed in 2009. Eric Young, stagnant and lifeless since his father's death, is coerced by his best friend, Sean, to borrow an identity and take back a forgone year of baseball eligibility. Once in class, Eric immediately connects with Monica, the charming, All-American daughter of his coach, Coach Donovan. Although Eric works harder than anyone to earn playing time, the jealous Donovan permanently relegates him to the bench. Due to his own hidden motives, Sean warns Eric to steer clear of Monica and to focus strictly on baseball. But when Eric turns the other ear, he finds the closer he grows to Monica, the darker the secrets that surface from her abusive past. Eric is ultimately forced to the weigh the challenges of his own mental well-being against the psychological pain which causes Monica to spiral out of control.

Great American Dream (2011) — Lim's second AmerAsian film is nearing completion. Eric Young and his new friend, Danny, re-enroll in college under false identities, attempting to erase their imperfect baseball pasts. As Eric tries his best to fit in on the team, he repeatedly finds himself the victim of jealous circumstances. However, Eric, still suffering from the loss of his father, connects deeply with Coach Pierce, still suffering from the loss of his son. But the closer the pair become, the further Danny distances himself, as he experiments with performance-enhancing drugs. When a pair of racist enemies from the past unexpectedly resurface, Eric's career swings full circle, presenting a bittersweet chance at redemption. Thus, Eric, forced to enter biggest game of his life, must stay completely hidden behind the catcher's mask, or jeopardize his identity amidst an increasingly ominous situation.

Young Again aka AmerAsian3 (2012) — Lim's 3rd installment of the AmerAsian Trilogy is currently in production with principal photography concluding in Summer 2009. Eric Young begins his final journey in graduate school where he's dared by Frates, his roommate, to try out for the Volcano baseball team by passing himself off as a decade younger. After Eric barely makes the cut, he returns the favor by mentoring Frates at catcher, despite the increasing suspicion of Smaller, the assistant coach, and Barber, the starting catcher. When the Volcanos learn they'll play a crucial exhibition against a minor league team, attracting several professional scouts, a physical and mental battle ignites between Eric and Frates for the starting job. But as the competition intensifies, Frates opts to take the ultimate short cut, causing tempers to fly out of control, and forcing Eric to learn the hard way just who Frates really is.

Filmography 
 Vanilla Sky (2001) – actor
 Rush Hour 2 (2001) – actor and stand-in for Jackie Chan
 Alias (2002) – actor
 The Young and the Restless (2002) – actor
 Tequila Express (2002 film)  – actor
 The Tonight Show with Jay Leno (2003–04) – actor (various characters)
 Rumor Has It… (2005) – actor
 Coach Carter (2005) – actor
 It Is Written (2007) – actor (various characters)
 L.A. Forensics (2007)  – actor
 NCIS (2007) – actor
 AmerAsian (2009) -- actor, director, producer, screenwriter
 Great American Dream (2010) -- actor, director, producer, screenwriter
 Young Again (2020) -- actor, director, producer, screenwriter

References

External links
 
 

Living people
1968 births
University of San Francisco alumni
Los Angeles Pierce College people
California State University, East Bay alumni